Spring of Joy is a 1993 Swedish drama film directed by Richard Hobert. Sven Lindberg won the award for Best Actor at the 29th Guldbagge Awards.

Cast
 Sven Lindberg as Ragnar Persson
 Göran Stangertz as Mick Pierson
 Camilla Lundén as Catti
 Helena Brodin as Ellen Persson
 Gunvor Pontén as Väninna
 Margreth Weivers as Väninna
 Maj Lindström as Väninna
 Stina von Sydow as Markvärdinnan
 Bertil Norström as Tullaren
 Pär Ericson as Tillsyningsman
 Linus Hedberg as Pojken
 Pierre Lindstedt as Bärgaren
 Jerker Fahlström as Kjell bilmekaniker

References

External links
 
 

1993 films
1993 drama films
Swedish drama films
1990s Swedish-language films
Films directed by Richard Hobert
1990s Swedish films